Electrokinetics or electrokinetic may refer to:

 Electrohydrodynamics, the study of the dynamics of electrically charged fluids
 Electrokinetic phenomena, a family of several different effects that occur in heterogeneous fluids
 Zeta potential, a scientific term for electrokinetic potential 
 Electrokinetic remediation, a technique of using direct electrical current to remove particles from the soil 
 Electro-kinetic road ramp, a method of generating electricity
 Micellar electrokinetic chromatography, a chromatography technique used in analytical chemistry